The year 1691 in science and technology involved some significant events.

Biology
 Italian Jesuit scholar Filippo Bonanni publishes the results of his microscopic observations of invertebrates in Observationes circa Viventia, quae in Rebus non-Viventibus.

Mathematics
 Gottfried Leibniz discovers the technique of separation of variables for ordinary differential equations.
 Michel Rolle invents Rolle's theorem.

Medicine
 Anton Nuck's Adenographia curiosa et uteri foeminei anatome nova is published at Leiden, including a description of the canal of Nuck and a demonstration that the embryo is derived from the ovary and not the sperm.

Technology
 Edmond Halley devises a diving bell.
 In music, the "equal temperament scale" used in modern music is developed by organist Andreas Werckmeister.

Births
 November 18 – Mårten Triewald, Swedish mechanical engineer (died 1747)

Deaths
 January 17 – Richard Lower, English physician who performed the first direct blood transfusion (born 1631)
 December 31 – Robert Boyle, Anglo-Irish chemist (born 1627)

References

 
17th century in science
1690s in science